Charlie Powell (born 29 October 1999) is an English rugby union player who plays for Bristol Bears in the Premiership Rugby.

References

External links
Bristol Bears Profile
ESPN Profile
Ultimate Rugby Profile

1999 births
Living people
Bristol Bears players
English rugby union players
People educated at Bristol Grammar School
Rugby union players from Bristol
Rugby union centres
Jersey Reds players